Faint or Fainting  may refer to:
 Syncope (medicine), a medical term for fainting
 Lightheadedness, in the sense of "feeling faint"
 "Faint" (song), by Linkin Park
 The Faint, a dance-punk/rock band
 "Faint" (M&M's advertisement), a Christmas-themed advertisement promoting the M&M's brand

See also
 Feint (disambiguation)